Stanton is an unincorporated community in Miami County, Kansas, United States.  It is part of the Kansas City metropolitan area.

History
Stanton was founded in 1855.  Stanton had a post office from 1857 until 1903.

References

Further reading

External links
 Miami County maps: Current, Historic, KDOT

Unincorporated communities in Miami County, Kansas
Unincorporated communities in Kansas
1855 establishments in Kansas Territory